Rupela adunca is a moth in the family Crambidae. It was described by Carl Heinrich in 1937. It is found in Bolivia.

The wingspan is about 39 mm. The wings are white.

References

Moths described in 1937
Schoenobiinae
Taxa named by Carl Heinrich